Jean-Désiré Ringel, known as Ringel d'Illzach (29 September 1849 in Illzach – 28 July 1916 in Strasbourg) was a French-Alsatian sculptor and engraver.

Biography
He was a pupil of François Jouffroy and Alexandre Falguière at the École des Beaux-arts in Paris and was best known for his medallions, made of diverse materials (bronze, terracotta, stoneware and glass paste), portraying a vast array of the notable artistic, literary, political and scientific figures of his time.

He never ceased to experiment with new processes for casting metals, incorporating new materials and developing ways to apply color. His vitreous enamel agglomerates had the appearance of precious stones with strange tonalities. Some of his masks, such as the one of Maurice Rollinat, are made of multicolored wax. He reproduced all of his works as engravings.

Much of his work was inspired by music, including a series of nine allegorical statues representing the symphonies of Beethoven. A polychrome statue, depicting the Rákóczy March from La damnation de Faust by Hector Berlioz, was the centerpiece of his exhibit at the 1897 Venice Biennial.

Some of its decorative cast-iron work, including masks and highly stylized seahorses, adorn balconies and walls of Hector Guimard's Castel Béranger (1895-1898).

Selected works

References

Further reading
 Anselme Laugel, "Biographies alsaciennes. Ringel d'Illzach", in Revue Alsacienne Illustrée, 1900 
 Theodor Knorr, Ringel-Illzach : ein elsässischer Bildner, Düsseldorf, 1905
 Gaston Kern, À la mémoire de Ringel d'Illzach, Strasbourg, 1919
 Jean-Luc Olivié, Ringel, un sculpteur et la céramique, à Paris et à Strasbourg, in Strasbourg 1900 : naissance d'une capitale, seminar, Musée d'art moderne et contemporain de Strasbourg, 1–4 December 1999, pgs.84-91

External links 

 Works by Ringel d'Illzach in Public Collections in France (Joconde)
  Un vase monumental de Ringel d’Illzach entre au Getty Museum, "La Tribune de l'art", 19 December 2009
 

1849 births
1916 deaths
People from Haut-Rhin
20th-century French sculptors
19th-century French sculptors
French male sculptors
19th-century French male artists